Ryan Mitchell Downard (born June 22, 1988) is an American football coach and former player who is the defensive backs coach for the Green Bay Packers of the National Football League (NFL). Downard was previously the safeties coach for the Bowling Green Falcons.

College career
After graduating from Shawnee High School, where he was nominated to the first-team All-Ohio team for multiple years, Downard chose to attend Eastern Michigan University. In Downard's redshirt freshman year, he recorded six interceptions for Eastern Michigan, tied for 12th nationally. For his performance in his redshirt freshman year, Downard was named as an honorable mention for the All-American team. Following Downard's freshman year, he remained a consistent starter, but injuries shortened his college career until he graduated in 2010.

Coaching career
Following his college football career, Downard became a graduate assistant for Toledo and Texas Tech for five months and a year respectively. Following his stints as a graduate assistant coach, Downard became an assistant coach for the Cleveland Browns from 2014-15. After his time with the Cleveland Browns, Downard joined the Bowling Green Falcons in 2016 and became the safeties coach in 2017. In 2018, Downard joined the Packers in 2018 as a defensive quality control coach, but later became the assistant defensive backs coach and was appointed safeties coach again in 2022. On March 10, 2023, Downard was promoted to defensive backs coach.

References

External links
 Green Bay Packers bio

Living people
1988 births
Sportspeople from Lima, Ohio
Green Bay Packers coaches
Bowling Green Falcons football coaches
Eastern Michigan Eagles football players
Cleveland Browns coaches